Srocko Małe  is a village in the administrative district of Gmina Stęszew, within Poznań County, Greater Poland Voivodeship, in west-central Poland. In the immediate vicinity are towns: Wronczyn, Będlewo, Piotrowo First, Sierniki, Głuchowo.

References

Villages in Poznań County